Henry Blood may refer to:

Henry Ames Blood (1836–1892), American historian
Henry H. Blood (1872–1942), 7th Governor of Utah, USA